Marcos Alonso may refer to any of the following Spanish footballers:

 Marcos Alonso (footballer, born 1933) (1933–2012), also known as "Marquitos", defender
 Marcos Alonso (footballer, born 1959) (1959–2023), his son, former winger and coach
 Marcos Alonso (footballer, born 1990), his grandson, defender/midfielder for Barcelona

See also
 Marcos (disambiguation)
 Alonso